Asalebria pseudoflorella is a species of snout moth in the genus Asalebria. It was described by Schmidt, in 1934. It is found in Spain.

References

Moths described in 1934
Phycitini
Moths of Europe